The Dépôt Joseph Cuvelier of the Belgian State Archives opened in 2011. Its name honors Belgian historian and government archivist Joseph Cuvelier (1869–1947).

Holdings
The repository contains archival materials related to the economic and political history of Belgium, including:
 Ministerial cabinets
 Didier Reynders (1999-2011)
 Olivier Chastel (2008-2011)
 Service public fédéral Économie
 Commission des brevets, 1914-1932
 Ministère de la Reconstruction(fr)
 Business enterprises, such as:
 Banque Belge pour l'Étranger
 Banque d’Outremer
 Chambre de commerce de Bruxelles
 Cimenterie CBR
 Clinique Malibran et Solbosch
 Compagnie de Pont à Mousson
 Compagnie financière Belgo-Chinoise
 Fabrimetal
 Fédération des Entreprises de Belgique (FEB)
 Fonderie Nationale des Bronzes
 ING
 Société Agefi
 Société Anversoise Foncière et Industrielle
 Société belge d’Entreprises en Chine
 Société Commerciale belgo-allemande du Congo
 Société Générale de Belgique

Congo-related material
The repository has material related to the colonial politics and economy of the Congo Free State (1885–1908) and Belgian Congo (1908-1960), such as:
 Dégâts Congo (administration, reconstruction)
 Commission (supérieure) d’indemnisation
 Business enterprises, including:
 Balser et Compagnie 
 Banque de Bruxelles
 Banque d’Outremer
 Banque Léon Lambert
 Collchimie-Congo (Group Hoechst Belgium)
  
 Compagnie des Bronzes
 Compagnie du Bécéka (Sibeka)
 Compagnie pour le Commerce et l’Industrie du Congo (Finoutremer)
 Deutsche Bank 
 Géomines
 Groep Coppée
 Siemens-Schuckert
 Société Agence Financière
 Société Anonyme de Production, de Transports et d’Echanges (Saptec)
 Société Anversoise Foncière et Industrielle
 Société Commerciale Belgo-Allemande du Congo
 Société de Crédit aux Classes Moyennes et à l’Industrie
 Société de Traction et Electricité (Tractionel)
 Société Financière de Transport et d'Entreprises Industrielles (Sofina)
 Société Générale de Belgique (Generale Maatschappij van België)
 Société Industrielle et Minière du Congo Oriental
 Steinhaus W. & Cie
 Union Minière du Haut Katanga
 Van de Winckel Hippolyte

See also
 Archives Africaines (Belgium)
 List of archives in Belgium

References

This article incorporates information from the Dutch Wikipedia and French Wikipedia.

Bibliography
   (Dutch version available free via email request)

External links
 Official site

Archives in Belgium
Federal departments and agencies of Belgium
Buildings and structures in Brussels
2011 establishments in Belgium